Don Pederson (December 23, 1928 – June 2, 2019) was an American politician from Nebraska. He served in the state legislature from 1996 to 2007.

Personal life
Pederson was born December 23, 1928, in Hastings, Nebraska. He attended University of Nebraska at Omaha, Grinnell College,  and University of Nebraska-Lincoln. Pederson was a lawyer and lived in North Platte, Nebraska. He served on the North Platte Board of Education. Pederson was a member of many North Platte organizations, bar associations, and the Presbyterian Church of North Platte. He was the father of former Nebraska Cornhuskers athletic director Steve Pederson. Pederson died from pancreatic cancer in 2019 at the age of 90.

Legislature service
He was appointed to the legislature on  September 5, 1996 to replace David Bernard-Stevens who had resigned. He was then elected in 1996 to represent the 42nd Nebraska legislative district and reelected in 1998 and 2002. He sat on the Nebraska Retirement Systems, Building Maintenance, and Legislative Performance Audit committees. He was also a nonvoting member of the Executive Board and Reference committees and served as the chair of the Appropriations committee. Since Nebraska voters passed Initiative Measure 415 in 2001 limiting state senators to two terms after 2001, he was unable run for reelection in 2006.

See also
Nebraska Legislature

References

 
 

1928 births
2019 deaths
University of Nebraska–Lincoln alumni
Nebraska lawyers
School board members in Nebraska
Nebraska state senators
People from Hastings, Nebraska
People from North Platte, Nebraska
American Presbyterians
Deaths from cancer in Nebraska
Deaths from pancreatic cancer
20th-century American lawyers